Komsomolsk-on-Amur Aircraft Plant (KnAAPO or KnAAZ); based in Komsomolsk-on-Amur in the Russian Far East, is the largest aircraft-manufacturing company in Russia.

The company is among Khabarovsk Krai's most successful enterprises, and for years has been the largest taxpayer of the territory.

In 1999 and 2001 the Russian Union of Industrialists and Entrepreneurs and the Chamber of Commerce and Industry of RF granted KnAAPO the title "best Russian enterprise".

Production
The company currently produces Su-27SM/SKM fighters, Su-30MK2 multirole fighters, Su-33 and Su-27KUB shipborne fighters, and Be-103 amphibians, among others. The assembly line for all versions of the new Sukhoi Superjet 100 is located at the company's facilities. Together with Novosibirsk Aircraft Production Association (which focuses on component production), the company is expected to produce 70 Superjet airframes by 2012. KnAAPO also manufactures the Sukhoi Su-57, and started in August 2021 to produce the Sukhoi Su-75 Checkmate.

The plant uses Dzyomgi Airport as a testing and delivery airfield.

Ownership
Shareholders of KnAAPO (JSC): 
United Aircraft Corporation (25.5% of the shares) 
“Sukhoi Company“ JSC (74.5% of the shares) 
KnAAPO (JSC) owns 5.41% of the shares of Sukhoi Design Bureau (JSC)

References

External links 

The company's website

Aircraft manufacturers of the Soviet Union
Sukhoi
Companies based in Khabarovsk Krai
1927 establishments in the Soviet Union